Oui, Oui, Marie is a 1918 song composed by Fred Fisher with lyrics written by Alfred Bryan and Joe McCarthy. It was published by McCarthy & Fisher Inc. The sheet music cover featured an illustration by Andre De Takacs. The song was in the top 20 charts from September 1918 to February 1919 and reached number 10 in December. It was recorded by Arthur Fields, Irving Kaufman, and Rachel Grant & Billy Murray. The sheet music can be found at the Pritzker Military Museum & Library.

The cover art for the song featured a woman dressed in a cape with a feathered hat speaking to a soldier.

A cover version was recorded by Chelsea Wolfe for the 2022 American slasher film X.

Analysis
The lyrics for Oui Oui, Marie center on a soldier named Johnny who falls in love with a French girl named Marie. He flirts with her even though he doesn't know how to speak French.

References

1918 songs
Songs of World War I
Songs with lyrics by Alfred Bryan
Songs with lyrics by Joseph McCarthy (lyricist)
Songs written by Fred Fisher